Immorality is the violation of moral laws, norms or standards. It refers to an agent doing or thinking something they know or believe to be wrong. Immorality is normally applied to people or actions, or in a broader sense, it can be applied to groups or corporate bodies, and works of art.

Ancient Greece
Callicles and Thrasymachus are two characters of Plato's dialogues, Gorgias and Republic, respectively, who challenge conventional morality.

Aristotle saw many vices as excesses or deficits in relation to some virtue, as cowardice and rashness relate to courage. Some attitudes and actionssuch as envy, murder, and thefthe saw as wrong in themselves, with no question of a deficit/excess in relation to the mean.

Religion
In Islam, Judaism and Christianity, sin is a central concept in understanding immorality.

Immorality is often closely linked with both religion and sexuality. Max Weber saw rational articulated religions as engaged in a long-term struggle with more physical forms of religious experience linked to dance, intoxication and sexual activity. Durkheim pointed out how many primitive rites culminated in abandoning the distinction between licit and immoral behavior.

Freud's dour conclusion was that "In every age immorality has found no less support in religion than morality has".

Sexual immorality

Coding of sexual behavior has historically been a feature of all human societies; as too has been the policing of breaches of its moressexual immoralityby means of formal and informal social control. Interdictions and taboos among primitive societies were arguably no less severe than in traditional agrarian societies. In the latter, the degree of control might vary from time to time and region to region, being least in urban settlements; however, only the last three centuries of intense urbanisation, commercialisation and modernisation have broken with the restrictions of the pre-modern world, in favor of a successor society of fractured and competing sexual codes and subcultures, where sexual expression is integrated into the workings of the commercial world.

Nevertheless, while the meaning of sexual immorality has been drastically redefined in recent times, arguably the boundaries of what is acceptable remain publicly policed and as highly charged as ever, as the decades-long debates in the US over reproductive rights after Roe v. Wade, or 21st-century controversy over child images on Wikipedia and Amazon would tend to suggest.

Modernity
Michel Foucault considered that the modern world was unable to put forward a coherent moralityan inability underpinned philosophically by emotivism. Nevertheless, modernism has often been accompanied by a cult of immorality, as for example when John Ciardi acclaimed Naked Lunch as "a monumentally moral descent into the hell of narcotic addiction".

Immoral psychoanalysis
Psychoanalysis received much early criticism for being the unsavory product of an immoral townVienna; psychoanalysts for being both unscrupulous and dirty-minded.

Freud himself however was of the opinion that "anyone who has succeeded in educating himself to truth about himself is permanently defended against the danger of immorality, even though his standard of morality may differ". Nietzsche referred to his ethical philosophy as Immoralism.

Literary references
When questioned by a proof-reader whether his description of Meleager as the immoral poet should be immortal poet, T. E. Lawrence replied: "Immorality I know. Immortality I cannot judge. As you please: Meleager will not sue us for libel".
De Quincey set out an (inverted) hierarchy of immorality in his study On Murder Considered as One of the Fine Arts: "if once a man indulges himself in murder, very soon he comes to think little of robbing; and from robbing he comes next to drinking and Sabbath-breaking, and from that to procrastination and incivility...this downward path".

See also

References

Further reading
Bible
Catechism of the Catholic Church
André Gide, L'Immoraliste (1902)
Catherine Edwards, The Politics of Immorality in Ancient Rome (2002)

External links

Morality
Ethics